Kicin may refer to the following places:
Kicin, Greater Poland Voivodeship (west-central Poland)
Kicin, Lublin Voivodeship (east Poland)
Kicin, Masovian Voivodeship (east-central Poland)